Lowe Inlet Marine Provincial Park is a provincial park in British Columbia, Canada located on the Inside Passage of the North Coast, 118 km south of Prince Rupert and 75 km north of Butedale.

Images

References

Provincial parks of British Columbia
North Coast Regional District
North Coast of British Columbia
Year of establishment missing
Marine parks of Canada